Kiren Rijiju (born 19 November 1971) is an Indian politician from Arunachal Pradesh who serves as the Cabinet Minister of Law and Justice in the Government of India.

Early life
Rijiju was born on 19 November 1971 at Nakhu near Nafra in West Kameng district of Arunachal Pradesh in India. He is the son of Rinchin Kharu and Chirai Rijiju. His father was the first pro-tem speaker of Arunachal Pradesh who gave oath to the Members of the First State Legislative Assembly.

He was a good athlete during his college days and as of February 2023 is seen playing Football and Badminton.

Education
Rijiju did his graduation degree (B.A.) from Hansraj College, University of Delhi. Further, in 1998, he did his graduate degree in law (LL.B) from Campus Law Centre, Faculty of Law, University of Delhi.

Political career
Kiren Rijiju is considered the face of Bharatiya Janata Party in North East India. He served as a Member of Khadi and Village Industries Commission from 2000 to 2005. Rijiju was appointed as India's Minister of Youth Affairs and Sports in 2019. He occasionally writes articles on security and socio-economic issues.

In the 2004 Indian general election, he was elected as a member of the 14th Lok Sabha, representing the constituency of Arunachal West in the Indian Parliament, which is the fourth largest Parliamentary constituency (in terms of Area) in India. He was one of the most articulate and outspoken Parliamentarians in the 14th Lok Sabha. Rijiju entered the Lok Sabha for the second time in 2014 from the Arunachal (West) constituency of Arunachal Pradesh in India.

During 2004-09, Rijiju was placed among the top 5 opposition MPs reviewed by their peers in the treasury bench based on high benchmark in debates, discussions, and decorum and was placed among stalwarts like L.K. Advani. He was also chosen as the best young MP by many national news agencies and magazines.

In the 2009 general election, Rijiju was defeated by a very thin margin of 1314 votes by the Congress candidate under a very controversial circumstances which witnessed massive violence amidst allegation of widespread polling booth capturing by Indian National Congress Party.

In the 2014 general election, Rijiju was again elected as a Member of Parliament in the 16th Lok Sabha, representing the Arunachal West constituency. Rijiju defeated Takam Sanjoy of the Indian National Congress by a margin of 43,738 votes. Immediately he found a place in Narendra Modi's first best of 45 Council of Minister's list as Minister of State for Home.

In 2017, he said "Rohingyas are illegal immigrants and stand to be deported". He also stated that "India has absorbed maximum number of refugees in the world so nobody should give India any lessons on how to deal with refugees".

Kiren Rijiju again got elected in 2019 by highest ever record margin of votes and became Minister of State (Independent Charge) for Youth Affairs and Sports and Minister of State for Ministry of Minority Affairs.

In July 2021, he became Cabinet Minister of Law and Justice in Second Modi ministry upon cabinet overhaul.

Personal life 
He married Joram Rina Rijiju in 2004. She is a graduate from Lady Shri Ram College for Women, New Delhi and is a gold medalist from Arunachal University. She is an Associate Professor teaching history at Dera Natung Government College, Itanagar in Arunachal Pradesh.

References

|-

|-

|-

|-

External links
 Website of Kiren Rijiju
 
 Official biographical sketch in Parliament of India website

1971 births
Living people
Bharatiya Janata Party politicians from Arunachal Pradesh
People from West Kameng district
Indian Buddhists
Faculty of Law, University of Delhi alumni
Lok Sabha members from Arunachal Pradesh
India MPs 2004–2009
India MPs 2014–2019
Union ministers of state of India
Ministry of Home Affairs (India)
Narendra Modi ministry
India MPs 2019–present
National Democratic Alliance candidates in the 2019 Indian general election